The Bamcha are a Hindu Scheduled Tribe found in the state of Gujarat in India. They are also known as Bavcha and sometimes Bavecha.

Origin 
The Bavcha people were a warrior people who arrived with the leader of the Maratha empire in 1757. Today they are mostly found in Gujarat, Karnataka and Maharashtra, states of west and south India. Their main language is Bavchi.
The Bamcha claim that their ancestors were soldiers in army of the princely state of Baroda. They gave up their profession when the ruler of Baroda disbanded his army. The community is said to have lost its kshatriya status, when an ancestor drank from a leather container. They are now found mainly in Amreli, Baroda, Patan, Sadra and Ahmedabad. The community speak the Bavchi dialect, but most can also speak Gujarati. - Rahul Raj Chaudhari

References

Social groups of Gujarat
Hindu communities
Tribal communities of Gujarat
Scheduled Tribes of India
Hindu ethnic groups